Peter Aaby (Danish, born 1944 in Lund, Sweden) is trained as an anthropologist but also holds a doctoral degree in medicine. In 1978, Peter Aaby established the Bandim Health Project, a Health and Demographic Surveillance System site in Guinea-Bissau in West Africa, which he has run ever since. In 2000, Peter Aaby was awarded the Novo Nordisk Prize, the most important Danish award within health research.

Aaby is credited for the discovery of non-specific effects of vaccines – i.e. effects of vaccines, which go beyond the specific protective effects against the targeted diseases. The theory of non-specific effects of vaccines was established in 1991 and later documented in several trials on measles vaccine, BCG, oral polio vaccine, DTP vaccine and smallpox vaccine. As a consequence of Aaby's work on non-specific effects of vaccines it has been recommended the WHO vaccination program in low income countries should be changed.  WHO recently reviewed the evidence for non-specific effects of BCG vaccine, measles vaccine and DTP vaccine, and concluded that it would "keep a watch on the evidence of nonspecific effects of vaccination".

See also
 Non-specific effect of vaccines
 Bandim Health Project
 Statens Serum Institut

References

External links
 Bandim Health Project webpage
 Statens Serum Institut website

1944 births
20th-century scientists
Danish scientists
Living people
People from Lund